HD 125658 is a candidate variable star in the northern constellation of Boötes.

References

External links
 HR 5374
 Image HD 125658

Boötes
125658
070051
A-type giants
5374
Suspected variables
Durchmusterung objects